La Chapelle-des-Pots is a commune in the center-east of the Charente-Maritime department in southwestern France,  in the former province of Saintonge.

History 
La Chapelle-des-Pots is a village where potters make ceramics for more than eight centuries. Many woods, brooks and local clay allowed the creation of ceramics. Bernard Palissy even worked with local potters.

Population

Places and monuments 

In the center of the town: a fountain covered with a dome made of cut stone and thrown into a wash-house, the church of Saint-Front (1786), whose foundations use stones from the old potters' chapel (Municipal Bulletin). A ceramic kiln built in 2006 of the chain type located near the town hall, an old ceramic kiln, call Varoqeau kiln, inscribed in historical monuments.

A school group inaugurated in 1955.

The municipality had an interesting regional museum: the Saintongean Ceramics Museum, where collections of local pottery from XIIIe to XXe. This museum, founded under the mandate of Raymond Viollier was closed by the current municipality.

Exterior of the borough: old seigniory, several small stone washhouses, numerous hiking trails VTT and pedestrian.

Environmental Heritage 
The GR 4 which runs from Royan to Grasse crosses the town and runs along the fountain of the center of the town.

Gallery

See also 
 Communes of the Charente-Maritime department
 Cognac, France

References

External links
 

Communes of Charente-Maritime